Marguerite Boucicaut, née Guérin (born 3 January 1816 in Verjux, France; died 8 December 1887, Cannes) was a French businesswoman and benefactor.  She participated in the creation and prosperity of the first department store, Au Bon Marché, in Paris alongside her husband Aristide Boucicaut. She became a philanthropist later in life.

Early life 
Marguerite was raised by a single mother after her birth in Verjux, in Saône et Loire. Her mother died when Marguerite was 13, and Marguerite began working in Paris at a laundress. She built up her savings and began to run a "broth" that catered to local workers, where she met her future husband Aristide.

Marguerite and Aristide began their relationship in 1836. In 1839, she had a son, but he died as an infant.

The Bon Marché 
In 1852, Aristide borrowed money to become the co-proprietor of the Bon Marché, before buying out his business partner in 1863. Upon Aristide's death in 1877, Marguerite continued to run the store, even expanding it.

The Boucicaut's treatment of their employees was novel for the time - a paternalistic relationship where the employees were given food, housing, entertainment, and education. In return, loyalty and adherence to a moral code (ironic given that the Boucicaut's relationship might have involved cohabitation before marriage).

In 1880, Marguerite changed the company to a société en commandite, or a partnership with her top managers that continued the "family" nature of the Bon Marché even after her death.

With no heirs, Marguerite willed her fortune to the employees of the Bon Marche and her social works, including a hospital and a home for unwed mothers.

References 

1816 births
1887 deaths
19th-century French businesspeople
19th-century French women
People from Saône-et-Loire